Alsat (formerly known as Alsat-M) is a national television station that broadcasts throughout the territory of North Macedonia and other Balkan countries. Its programming is transmitted mainly in Albanian and occasionally in Macedonian, based on the European concepts of information that aim to foster multi-ethnic coexistence in North Macedonia. Alsat has a dynamic range of programming that covers: news, politics, economy, entertainment, music, sports, movies, series and documentaries.

Programming

Original programming
Ditë e re
Pasdite me Alsat
360 gradë
Pasqyra e shëndetit
Rruga drejt
Bota e re
Magazina ekonomike
Pro Sports
Programi 200
Super sfida
Hallkit
Të gatuajmë me Alsat
Pizzicato
Carpe Diem
Të gatuajmë për mysafirët
Flitet se
Rajoni
Kënaqësia e gatimit
Emisioni 5+
Shpuza Show
Busted

References

Television channels in North Macedonia
Television channels and stations established in 2006